The 1934–35 Football League season was Birmingham Football Club's 39th in the Football League and their 22nd in the First Division. They finished in 19th position in the 22-team division, three points clear of the relegation places. They also competed in the 1934–35 FA Cup, entering at the third round proper and losing to Burnley in the sixth (quarter-final).

Thirty players made at least one appearance in nationally organised competition, and there were twelve different goalscorers. Half-backs Charlie Calladine and Lewis Stoker made 42 and 41 appearances respectively over the 46-match season, and Charlie Wilson Jones was leading scorer with 17 goals, of which 16 came in the league; Frank White scored one fewer.

Joe Bradford made his 445th and last competitive appearance for Birmingham on 7 May 1935, the final game of this season, at home to Everton. He spent 15 years with the club, was their top scorer for 12 consecutive seasons, and holds club records for League goals scored (249), goals scored in all competitions (267), and goals scored in a top-flight season (29). While a Birmingham player, Bradford won 12 caps for England, scoring 7 goals.

Football League First Division

League table (part)

FA Cup

Appearances and goals

Players with name struck through and marked  left the club during the playing season.

See also
Birmingham City F.C. seasons

References
General
 Matthews, Tony (1995). Birmingham City: A Complete Record. Derby: Breedon Books. .
 Matthews, Tony (2010). Birmingham City: The Complete Record. Derby: DB Publishing. .
 Source for match dates and results: Birmingham City 1934–1935: Results. Statto Organisation. Retrieved 11 May 2012.
 Source for lineups, appearances, goalscorers and attendances: Matthews (2010), Complete Record, pp. 310–11.
 Source for kit: "Birmingham City". Historical Football Kits. Retrieved 22 May 2018.

Specific

Birmingham City F.C. seasons
Birmingham